Welchman is an English surname. Notable people with the surname include:

Edward Welchman (1665–1739), English theologian and Archdeacon of Cardigan
Harry Welchman (1886–1966), English actor
Hugh Welchman (born 1975), British filmmaker, screenwriter and producer
Gordon Welchman (1906–1985), English mathematician, academic, codebreaker and writer
William Welchman (1866–1954), Archdeacon of Bristol

English-language surnames